Everette E. Dennis is an American scholar, formerly the Dean of Northwestern University in Qatar from 2011 to 2019, and an Elected Fellow of the American Academy of Arts & Sciences.

References

Year of birth missing (living people)
Living people
Northwestern University faculty
American expatriate academics